Nirbhaya Fund was an Indian rupee 10 billion corpus announced by Government of India in its 2013 Union Budget. The Finance Minister P. Chidambaram expected the fund to support initiatives protecting the dignity and ensuring safety of women in India. Nirbhaya (fearless) was the pseudonym given to the 2012 Delhi gang rape victim. The Ministry of Women and Child Development and several other ministries decided the application of the fund. One use was to open One Stop Centres to support women who are victims of violence.

History 

Nirbhaya Fund was announced by the Finance Minister in his 2013 budget speech, with Government contribution of Rs. 1000 crores for empowerment, safety and security of women and girl children. The fund is administered by Department of Economic Affairs of the finance ministry.

Use of funds 
Various ministries proposed projects to use this fund to enhance the safety and security of women. Some of the ministries which submitted proposals were the Ministry of Information Technology, the Ministry of Road Transport and Highways, Ministry of Railways and Ministry of Home Affairs. The Ministry of Home Affairs (MHA) approved a Safe City project for Lucknow at a total cost of Rs. 194.44 crore under the
Nirbhaya Fund Scheme.

In November 2013, the Ministry of Urban Development asked states to propose and implement new plans that can be financed through the Nirbhaya Fund. The ministry has also notified States and Union Territories who would not get their quotas of new buses under the Jawaharlal Nehru National Urban Renewal Mission if they fail to put in place steps to make public transport system safe for women.

The fund was used to create "One Step Centres" or "Sakhi" across the country where women who were victim's of violence could find support. The One Stop Centres were initially set up with one proposed for every Indian state after a recommendation in 2013. The One Stop Centre in Raipur and the one in Lucknow (both funded by Nirbhaya) gained Nari Shakti Puraskar awards on International Women's Day in 2018 and 2019 respectively for their work in empowering women.

References 

Violence against women in India
Women's rights in India
Government schemes in India
2013 establishments in India